

Chile lay in a region which is adjacent to the fast-moving Nazca Plate, and has high tectonic activity. The records for earlier centuries are apparently incomplete.

Of the world's 46 known earthquakes with M ≥ 8.5 since the year 1500, one-third occurred in Chile and are shown in the map to the side. Some virtually have the same epicenters like the 1604 and 1868 (in Arica), the 1730 and 1822 (in Valparaíso), the 1751 and 1835 (in Concepción), and the 1575 and 1837 (in Valdivia).

The strongest known recorded in modern times was also in Chile, the 1960 Valdivia earthquake.

Earthquakes

See also
Geology of Chile

References

  Servicio sismológico Universidad de Chile, Sismos importantes o destructivos desde 1570
 Historic World Earthquakes: Chile, United States Geological Survey

External links

 
Earthquakes
Chile
Tsunamis in Chile